Dorcadion minkovae is a species of beetle in the family Cerambycidae. It was described by Heyrovsky in 1962. It is known from Bulgaria.

References

minkovae
Beetles described in 1962